Mainer (formerly known as The Bollard) is a monthly local magazine based in Portland, Maine, covering local news and arts.

History and profile
The Bollard was founded in 2005 with $3000. The first issue of the magazine was published online in September of that year. From 2007 to June 2008, it printed quarterly and thereafter switched to monthly publications. It is a free publication available in public places across southern Maine and online. The magazine is published by the Bollard Publishing owned by Chris Busby. In 2019, the Bollard was renamed Mainer.

Editor
The Bollard was established by owner/editor-in-chief Chris Busby in 2005 after the collapse of another local paper named the Casco Bay Weekly.

References

2005 establishments in Maine
Free magazines
Local interest magazines published in the United States
Magazines established in 2005
Magazines published in Maine
Mass media in Portland, Maine
Monthly magazines published in the United States
Online magazines published in the United States
Quarterly magazines published in the United States